The Democratic Union was a liberal Christian-democratic party in Poland. The party was founded in 1991 by Prime Minister, Christian democrat Tadeusz Mazowiecki as a merger of the Citizens' Movement for Democratic Action (Ruch Obywatelski Akcja Demokratyczna) and the Forum of Right Democrats (Forum Prawicy Demokratycznej).

The party had a market-socialist profile with Christian-democratic influence. Important members were Bronisław Geremek, Jacek Kuroń, Adam Michnik, Hanna Suchocka, Jan Rokita and Aleksander Hall.

In 1994 the party merged with the Liberal Democratic Congress into the Freedom Union (Unia Wolności).

Election results

Sejm

Senate

See also
Christian democracy

References

1990 establishments in Poland
1994 disestablishments in Poland
Christian democratic parties in Europe
Defunct liberal political parties
Defunct political parties in Poland
Liberal parties in Poland
Political parties disestablished in 1994
Political parties established in 1990